Brian Henderson (18 June 1943 – 16 June 2017) was an Australian rules footballer who played for the Carlton Football Club in the Victorian Football League (VFL).

Notes

External links 

Brian Henderson's profile at Blueseum

1943 births
2017 deaths
Carlton Football Club players
Australian rules footballers from Victoria (Australia)